The Devaux Coupe is an Australian automobile released by Devaux Cars Pty Ltd in 2001. The Devaux Coupe was designed by David J Clash in Australia. It was named after his mother's maiden name (French ancestors) as the car was inspired by the great French coach builders of the 1930s. There is also a spyder variant, and the cars are available in both left-hand or right-hand drive, the gray coupe shown here being the former.

This vehicle is not related to the DeVaux, an American built automobile of the 1930s.

The company is based in Upper Beaconsfield, Victoria. No prices are given on their website but an article on the Australian website UniqueCarsMag gives a price of $195,000 AUD (about $124,000 US at that time).

References

External links 
 Devaux Cars Official Website

Cars of Australia
Retro-style automobiles
Luxury motor vehicle manufacturers